Daniel Blaikie  is a Canadian politician who was elected to represent the riding of Elmwood—Transcona in the House of Commons of Canada in the 2015 Canadian federal election as a member of the New Democratic Party (NDP). He is the New Democratic Party (NDP)'s critic for the Treasury Board and the deputy critic for Ethics in the 42nd Canadian Parliament. He is the son of former NDP deputy leader Bill Blaikie, who held the riding from 1979 to 2008, and brother of former NDP President Rebecca Blaikie.

Blaikie was nominated as the NDP candidate for his father's former riding ahead of the 2015 election. He defeated Conservative incumbent Lawrence Toet by only 61 votes, the lowest margin of victory for any Canadian MP elected that year. He was the only non-Liberal elected from a Winnipeg riding, as the Liberals rose from being the third-largest party to Government, while the Conservatives fell from Government to Official Opposition, and the NDP from Official Opposition to third-party status. Blaikie led in most pre-election opinion polling, but a last-minute Liberal surge both in Winnipeg and nationwide resulted in him narrowly defeating Toet by only 61 votes. He defeated Toet in a 2019 rematch by a much larger margin of over 3,500.

Early life and education
Daniel Blaikie was born to Brenda and Bill Blaikie in the northeast Winnipeg suburb of Transcona. Before entering the trades, Blaikie studied philosophy and history at the University of Winnipeg, from which he graduated with an undergraduate degree. He went on to earn a master's degree in philosophy at Concordia University in Montreal.

Blaikie later trained as an electrician, becoming very active in the International Brotherhood of Electrical Workers, of which he is still a member.

Blaikie acted as an advisor to the Minister of Health in the Government of Manitoba.

Community work
Blaikie has been involved in several community engagements in Transcona, Winnipeg, and in the province of Manitoba. He has sat on the Board of directors of the Transcona Historical Museum in the past and continues to maintain his interest and involvement with the museum. As an MP, he currently sits as an honorary board member.

Blaikie is an active associate member of the Royal Canadian Legion - Branch #7 known by locals as the Transcona Legion. With its official formation date being December 6, 1926, the legion celebrated its 90th anniversary in 2016. He commemorated the anniversary as a Member of Parliament by using his allotted time for Statements by Members in the House of Commons to speak to the Legion's history and relevance in the community.

Before becoming an MP, Blaikie was a board member of the Apprenticeship and Certification Board of Manitoba, which coordinates the apprenticeship and certification system in Manitoba.

After being elected to the House of Commons, Daniel Blaikie continued to sit on the executive of the Winnipeg Labour Council for a period. During his electoral campaign in 2015, the council was active in supporting his campaign to become a Member of Parliament.

Parliament of Canada

42nd Parliament
Blaikie is a Vice-Chair of the Standing Committee on Access to Information, Privacy and Ethics, and is also a member of several parliamentary associations, including the Canada-Europe Parliamentary Association, Canada-Ireland Interparliamentary Group, Canada-United Kingdom Inter-Parliamentary Association, Canada-United States Inter-Parliamentary Group, and Commonwealth Parliamentary Association (CPA), as well a part of the Canadian Delegations to the Organization for Security and Co-operation in Europe Parliamentary Assembly (OSCE PA), NATO Parliamentary Association (NATO PA) and ParlAmericas.

Electoral record

References

External links
 Official bio

1984 births
Living people
Canadian people of Scottish descent
New Democratic Party MPs
Members of the House of Commons of Canada from Manitoba
Trade unionists from Manitoba
Electricians
Politicians from Winnipeg
Concordia University alumni
University of Winnipeg alumni
21st-century Canadian politicians
International Brotherhood of Electrical Workers people